The Huxley Lecture was a memorial lecture instituted by Charing Cross Hospital Medical School in 1896 to honour Thomas Henry Huxley and is delivered biennially. The Huxley Lecture was one of two memorial lectures created to honour Huxley. The other lecture series is known as the The Huxley Memorial Medal and Lecture and was created in 1900 by the Royal Anthropological Institute of Great Britain and Ireland.

Recipients

References

British lecture series